Melvin Starkey Henderson (1883–1954) was an American orthopedic surgeon, who was born in St. Paul, Minnesota (USA).

Biography
Upon his mother's death, he went to Winnipeg, Manitoba, to live with relatives, the family of Eliza Starkey, his surviving maternal aunt, and Edward Drewry, owner of the Drewry Brewery. He was raised with the Drewry children at the Drewry-family home "Redwood" enjoying a supportive environment and summering with his father at the St Paul farm.   He continued to receive generous financial support to continue his undergraduate college and medical degrees from the University of Toronto. He returned to the US and interned at the County Hospital in St. Paul, and in 1907 went to work in Rochester, Minnesota, as a surgical assistant with the Mayo brothers practice, William James and Charles Horace Mayo. He worked closely with Will Mayo, as his assistant, and in keeping with his preference and skill as a "bone surgeon", it was decided that the young Henderson would limit his practice to a precise specialty. In 1911, Henderson went abroad to the UK, to work under Sir Robert Jones in Liverpool, England and then Sir Harold Stiles in Edinburgh, Scotland, both recognized as experts in the new field of specialized orthopaedic surgery. Upon his return to Rochester, he then proceeded to organize and head the new section of orthopaedic surgery at the Mayo Clinic, until he retired in 1948.  He spent his medical career in Rochester, working closely with the Mayo brothers in the early years, contributing to The Mayo Clinic's growth into the major medical practice it has gone on to become, and witnessing the small city's expansion.

During his tenure, he consulted and advised many associates.  Always a visionary, he accepted a meeting in 1940 with Sister Elizabeth Kenny.  Although she was already denounced by many physicians and surgeons, including the AMA president, as an "ignorant quack seeking money for her own gain", Henderson chose to make his own opinions.  Instead of dismissing her and her experience as just an untrained nurse of polio patients, Henderson referred her to an associate in Minneapolis, Minnesota. There, she was finally given a chance to demonstrate her work to doctors Miland Knapp and John Pohl, who headed the polio treatment centers and told her that she should "stick around". However, Henderson's wife, Mabel, was also a strong personality of pioneer stock; a nurse called to training as a first graduate of St Mary's Nursing School which began following disastrous tornadoes in the Rochester area, which may have contributed to Henderson's open mind.

Henderson operated on many famous athletes, actors, personalities from around the world, as well as, provided free surgery to patients as needed. He kept precise research notes on his surgeries and outcomes, and published numerous articles for medical journals. He presented his work at many medical organizations, developed surgical techniques, and equipment. He is recognised for his research on synovial chondromatosis, a disease affecting the thin flexible membrane around a joint called the synovium. The disorder is also known as Reichel's syndrome, Henderson-Jones syndrome, or Reichel-Jones-Henderson syndrome, named after Doctors Friedrich Paul Reichel, Hugh Toland Jones and Melvin Starkey Henderson.

Henderson was involved in many national and international organizations, and was a founder and first President of the American Board of Orthopaedic Surgeons, when it was established at the Kahler Hotel in Rochester, Minnesota, on June 5, 1934. Describing the organization of the board, the closed, socially elite Eastern establishment of surgeons, withheld endorsement, "After all, in the opinion of the East Coast establishment, Henderson (who was born in St. Paul, was educated in Canada, and had his beginning with the Mayo brothers as a clinical assistant riding a bicycle around Rochester, making house calls on the Mayo brothers' patients) was a mere upstart." He was 31 years old and had already been President of the American Orthopaedic Association and Clinical Orthopaedic Society, as well as prominent in the American Medical Association and other organizations. Henderson was one of three of the first 15 AAOS presidents (the other two being Drs. Philip D. Wilson and John C. Wilson, Sr.) who had a son who succeeded him professionally as both President and as the Director of Orthopaedic Surgery at the Mayo Clinic. He was greatly respected for his organizational abilities, particularly at the Board, whose objectives were uncertain in the beginning and required his careful guidance. Henderson served on the Trustee Board for the Mayo Clinic, and many other professional and charitable foundations.

Throughout his busy career, Henderson remained a gifted amateur photographer.  Disappearing into his darkroom when he had the opportunity, he later entered his photographs to document his family, friendships, and professional associates into his scrapbooks.  Also an early fan of the movie camera, beginning in the 1920s, he documented many activities in hundreds and hundreds of feet of old black-and-white 16mm movie reels of the Mayo family and fellow associates, his travels, and of his family, all in the possession of his family today.

Henderson died June 17, 1954, in Rochester, Minnesota, from cardiac disease when he was 71 years old.

Personal life
Born February 18, 1883, in St Paul, Minnesota, to Melvin Brooks Henderson (1860–1939) and Emilie "Emma" Grace Starkey (1860–1894)
Married:  Mabel Lillian Christensen on February 10, 1912, in Forest Lake, Minnesota; originally from Marshfield, WI (1884–1959)
Sons:      Melvin Starkey Henderson, Jr (1923–1965);   Edward Drewry Henderson, MD (1919–2007)
Home:    Constructed his family home on First Avenue, in Rochester with the area to eventually become known as "Pill Hill" due to all the Mayo physicians choosing to live there.

Notes

American orthopedic surgeons
People from Saint Paul, Minnesota
1883 births
1954 deaths
20th-century surgeons